Shahpurabad (also Romanized as Shāhpūrābād and Shahpoor Abad; also known as Abūz̄arābād) is a village in Borborud-e Gharbi Rural District, in the Central District of Aligudarz County, Lorestan Province, Iran. At the 2006 census, its population was 1,364, in 276 families.

References 

Towns and villages in Aligudarz County